Dust Networks, Inc. is an American company specializing in the design and manufacture of wireless sensor networks for industrial applications including process monitoring, condition monitoring, asset management, Environment, Health and Safety (EHS) monitoring and power management. They were acquired by Linear Technology, Inc in December 2011, which in turn was acquired by Analog Devices, Inc in 2017. The Dust Networks product team operates in the IoT Networking Platforms group of Analog Devices.

Dust Networks works with industry and standards groups such as WirelessHART, IEEE and IETF to help drive the adoption of interoperable wireless sensor networking products.

Company history
In 1997, Kristofer S. J. Pister, a professor of electrical engineering and computer sciences at the University of California, Berkeley, conceived of and started the Smart Dust project with DARPA funding.

Smart Dust

The Smart Dust project attempted to demonstrate that a complete sensor/communication system could be made of sensors one cubic millimeter in size. This involved advances in miniaturization, integration, and energy management. The project focus was independent of any particular sensor, and looked at both commercial and military applications including:

 Defense-related sensor networks such as battlefield surveillance, treaty monitoring, transportation monitoring, and scud hunting.
 Virtual keyboard sensors: by attaching miniature remotes on each fingernail, accelerometers could then sense the orientation and motion of each fingertip, and communicate this data to a computer in a wristwatch.
 Inventory control: by placing miniature sensors on each object in the inventory system (product package, carton, pallet, truck warehouse, internet), each component could "talk" to the next component in the system. This evolved into today's RFID inventory control systems.
 Product quality monitoring: temperature and humidity monitoring of perishables such as meat, produce, and dairy.
 Impact, vibration and temperature monitoring of consumer electronics, for failure analysis and diagnostic information, e.g. monitoring the vibration of bearings to detect frequency signatures that may indicate imminent failure.

The project led to the founding of Dust Networks, to provide commercial applications of the above.

Timeline
 July 2002: Dust Networks founded by Pister, Tod Dykstra, Rob Conant and Brett Warneke
 February 2004: Completes $7 million Series A financing from Foundation Capital, Institutional Venture Partners and In-Q-Tel
 July 2004: First product delivered - SmartMesh shipping
 February 2005: Completes $22 million Series B financing from Crescendo Ventures, Cargill Ventures and prior investors
 March 2005: Launches products based on IEEE 802.15.4 standard in the 2.4 GHz ISM band
 June 2006: Launches SmartMesh-XT wireless sensor networking system optimized for industrial applications
 September 2007: WirelessHART standard ratified
 October 2007: SmartMesh IA-500 family of WirelessHART standards-based systems announced
 July 2008: Launches initiative focused on the use of Internet Protocol (IP) networking in urban infrastructure, building automation, utility metering, and other wireless sensor networking applications
 December 2011: Dust Networks is acquired by Linear Technology
 2017: Linear Technology is acquired by Analog Devices

Technology
Wireless sensor networks attempt to increase transmission reliability and quickly adapt should the transmission fail and automatically route around failed links. This requires embedded networking intelligence that establishes, maintains and utilizes redundant multi-hop routing from source to destination.

Dust Networks implements full-mesh networks, sometimes referred to as ‘mesh-to-the-edge’, which provides redundant routing to the edge of the network.  In a full-mesh network every device has the same routing capabilities and is able to ‘decide’ where it belongs in the routing structure based on what other nodes it can communicate with, its proximity to the network gateway, and its traffic load. This allows for self-forming and self-healing.  The multi-chip modules used to drive these networks are divided into 'gateways' and 'motes' (or mote modules). Gateways then tie back into larger networks used to make decisions within large industrial plants (oil refineries, chemical plants, produce facilities, etc.).

The company has evolved from using a proprietary protocol called TSMP (Time Synchronized Mesh Protocol), to WirelessHART to launching an Internet Protocol-based initiative, in support of the Internet Engineering Task Force (IETF), focused on the use of IP networking in urban infrastructure, building automation, utility metering, and other wireless sensor networking applications.

See also
Smartdust

References

Smart Dust Future at Nanowerk.com
"DOE Chooses Dust Networks for Advanced Lighting Control Project", February 2005

External links
UC Berkeley Smart Dust Project
Kris Pister's Smart Dust Page

Wireless sensor network
Companies based in Hayward, California
American companies established in 2004
Technology companies based in the San Francisco Bay Area
2004 establishments in California
Electronics companies established in 2004